Tereza Vyoralová (born January 16, 1994) is a Czech basketball player for USK Praha and the Czech national team, where she participated at the 2014 FIBA World Championship.

References

1994 births
Living people
Czech women's basketball players
Point guards
People from Weißenfels